Patricia Lopez or Patricia López may refer to:

 Patricia López (born 1977), Chilean actress and singer
 Patricia Lopez (journalist), reporter for the CW11 Morning News on New York City's WPIX-TV
 Patricia D. Lopez, computer scientist
 Patricia López (swimmer) (born 1956), Argentine swimmer